Lyall Arthur Schwarzkopf (born June 10, 1931) is an American politician in the state of Minnesota. He served in the Minnesota House of Representatives from 1963–1972. He previously served as the Chairman of the Hennepin County, Minnesota Republican Party and Field Secretary of the Minnesota State Medical Association. Schwarzkopf was later chief of staff for Minnesota governor Arne Carlson. He also served in the United States Army.

References

1931 births
Living people
People from Waupaca, Wisconsin
Military personnel from Wisconsin
Republican Party members of the Minnesota House of Representatives